Lewis Polk Rutherfurd (born August 3, 1944) is an American-born financier who lives in Hong Kong. He was married to Janet Jennings Auchincloss, the half-sister of First Lady Jacqueline Lee "Jackie" Bouvier from 1966 until her death in 1985. In 1989, he married Katharine duPont Sanger, the granddaughter of Lammot du Pont II.

Early life
Rutherfurd, born , is the son of Alice Polk and Winthrop Rutherfurd, Jr. of New York and Fishers Island, former president of Coast Metals, a manufacturer of hard-surface metals in Little Ferry, N.J. the grandson of Winthrop Rutherfurd and Frank L. Polk, Under Secretary of State in Woodrow Wilson's cabinet and named founder of Davis Polk & Wardwell, and the great-grandson of Levi P. Morton, the former Governor of New York and Vice-President of the United States under Benjamin Harrison.

Rutherfurd attended Princeton University, graduating in 1966 with a bachelor's degree in East Asian Studies, and later Harvard, where he earned an M.B.A. with distinction from the Harvard University Graduate School of Business.

Career
In 1989, Rutherfurd was a managing director of Royal Trust Enterprise Capital, a venture capital firm in Hong Kong.

Rutherfurd set up Inter-Asia Venture Management, Ltd, a venture capital firm, in Hong Kong in 1972, raising a $1 million for their first fund. They went on to complete 15 investments. Their first notable deal, in 1974, was the expansion of McDonald's into Hong Kong.

As of March 2016, Rutherfurd was the co-founder and Managing Director of Inter-Asia Venture Management, Ltd.

Rutherfurd was a former Governor and Vice President of the American Chamber of Commerce in Hong Kong, an Advisory Board member of Princeton in Asia and a former trustee of Berkshire School. He is past Co-Chairman and executive committee member of the Hong Kong Venture Capital Association and acts as trustee of the Mary Wood Foundation.

Personal life
On July 30, 1966, he married Janet Jennings Auchincloss (1945–1985), the daughter of stockbroker Hugh Dudley Auchincloss, Jr. (1897–1976) and socialite Janet Norton Lee (1907–1989).  Auchincloss had two half-sisters from her mother's first marriage to stockbroker John Vernou "Black Jack" Bouvier III, Jackie Kennedy and Lee Radziwill, three half-siblings from her father's previous marriages: Hugh III (born 1927), Nina (born 1935), and Thomas (born 1937), and one younger brother born to her parents, James Lee Auchincloss (born 1947). After their marriage, the couple moved to Hong Kong, where she later founded an overseas chapter of the League of Women Voters. They had three children:

 Lewis Stuyvesant Rutherfurd
 Andrew Hugh Auchincloss Rutherfurd
 Alexandra Rutherfurd

Janet died of cancer at the age of 39 in a Boston hospital on March 13, 1985.

On June 10, 1989, Rutherfurd married Katharine duPont Sanger. Sanger was the president of Windsurfing of Sanibel, a Florida sailboard and sports clothing shop, and graduated from Wheelock College. Her father was a Republican state senator and president pro tem in Delaware. Her stepfather was the retired president and founder of Laird and Company, an investment concern in Wilmington, and she was the granddaughter of Lammot du Pont II. They divorced in 1994.

References

1944 births
Living people
Businesspeople from New York City
Rutherfurd family
Princeton University alumni
Harvard Business School alumni
Polk family
Morton family (United States)